William O'Donnell (13 January 1912 – 28 January 1980) was an Irish hurler. At club level he played for Golden–Kilfeacle and Éire Óg Annacarty and was the left wing-forward on the Tipperary senior hurling team that won the 1937 All-Ireland Championship.

A native of Golden, County Tipperary, O'Donnell was educated at Rockwell College, where he won a Harty Cup medal in 1930. He began his club career with Golden–Kilfeacle but won a Tipperary Senior Championship medal with Éire Óg Annacarty in 1943, after transferring to them in January of that year.

O'Donnell made his first appearance for the Tipperary senior hurling team during the 1934 Munster Championship and had a number of successes as a forward over the following decade. In 1937 he won an All-Ireland Championship medal when Tipperary defeated Kilkenny, having earlier won a Munster Championship medal. O'Donnell won a second Munster Championship medal in 1941.

Honours
Rockwell College
Dr Harty Cup (1): 1930

Éire Óg Annacarty
Tipperary Senior Hurling Championship (1): 1943

Tipperary
All-Ireland Senior Hurling Championship (1): 1937
Munster Senior Hurling Championship (2): 1937, 1941

Munster
Railway Cup (4): 1938, 1940, 1942 (c), 1943

References

1912 births
1980 deaths
All-Ireland Senior Hurling Championship winners
Dual players
Éire Óg Annacarty hurlers
Golden-Kilfeacle hurlers
Heads of schools in Ireland
Munster inter-provincial hurlers
Tipperary inter-county hurlers
Tipperary inter-county Gaelic footballers